Yohei Suzuki (born April 6, 1973) is a Japanese mixed martial artist. He competed in the lightweight division.

Mixed martial arts record

|-
| Win
| align=center| 8-8-1
| Yuji Inoue
| TKO (Punches)
| Shooto: Shooting Disco 11: Tora Tora Tora!
| 
| align=center| 1
| align=center| 1:13
| Tokyo, Japan
| 
|-
| Loss
| align=center| 7-8-1
| Tomonori Taniguchi
| KO (Punches)
| Shooto: Battle Mix Tokyo 3
| 
| align=center| 2
| align=center| 2:41
| Tokyo, Japan
| 
|-
| Loss
| align=center| 7-7-1
| Takeshi Inoue
| TKO (Punches)
| Shooto: 3/22 in Korakuen Hall
| 
| align=center| 1
| align=center| 2:40
| Tokyo, Japan
| 
|-
| Loss
| align=center| 7-6-1
| Naoki Matsushita
| Decision (Unanimous)
| Shooto: Gig Central 2
| 
| align=center| 2
| align=center| 5:00
| Nagoya, Aichi, Japan
| 
|-
| Win
| align=center| 7-5-1
| Ken Omatsu
| Decision (Unanimous)
| Shooto: Treasure Hunt 9
| 
| align=center| 2
| align=center| 5:00
| Setagaya, Tokyo, Japan
| 
|-
| Loss
| align=center| 6-5-1
| Hermes Franca
| Submission (Guillotine Choke)
| HOOKnSHOOT: Relentless
| 
| align=center| 1
| align=center| 1:04
| Evansville, Indiana, United States
| 
|-
| Win
| align=center| 6-4-1
| Patrick Rahael
| TKO (Punches)
| Shooto: Wanna Shooto 2002
| 
| align=center| 1
| align=center| 3:20
| Setagaya, Tokyo, Japan
| 
|-
| Loss
| align=center| 5-4-1
| Takaharu Murahama
| Decision (Unanimous)
| Shooto: Gig East 8
| 
| align=center| 2
| align=center| 5:00
| Tokyo, Japan
| 
|-
| Win
| align=center| 5-3-1
| Victor Estrada
| TKO (Strikes)
| HOOKnSHOOT: Kings 2
| 
| align=center| 2
| align=center| 0:00
| Evansville, Indiana, United States
| 
|-
| Win
| align=center| 4-3-1
| Masakazu Kuramochi
| Decision (Unanimous)
| Shooto: Gig East 5
| 
| align=center| 2
| align=center| 5:00
| Tokyo, Japan
| 
|-
| Loss
| align=center| 3-3-1
| Tatsuya Kawajiri
| Submission (Rear-Naked Choke)
| Shooto: Gig East 2
| 
| align=center| 1
| align=center| 2:42
| Tokyo, Japan
| 
|-
| Draw
| align=center| 3-2-1
| Tatsuya Kawajiri
| Draw
| Shooto: Wanna Shooto 2001
| 
| align=center| 2
| align=center| 5:00
| Setagaya, Tokyo, Japan
| 
|-
| Win
| align=center| 3-2
| Kazumichi Takada
| Decision (Unanimous)
| Shooto: R.E.A.D. 6
| 
| align=center| 2
| align=center| 5:00
| Tokyo, Japan
| 
|-
| Win
| align=center| 2-2
| Mitsuo Matsumoto
| Decision (Unanimous)
| Shooto: R.E.A.D. 1
| 
| align=center| 2
| align=center| 5:00
| Tokyo, Japan
| 
|-
| Loss
| align=center| 1-2
| Yohei Nanbu
| Decision (Unanimous)
| Shooto: Shooter's Ambition
| 
| align=center| 2
| align=center| 5:00
| Setagaya, Tokyo, Japan
| 
|-
| Loss
| align=center| 1-1
| Takaharu Murahama
| Decision (Unanimous)
| Shooto: Renaxis 3
| 
| align=center| 2
| align=center| 5:00
| Setagaya, Tokyo, Japan
| 
|-
| Win
| align=center| 1-0
| Zack Potter
| Decision
| UFCF: Road to the Championships 1
| 
| align=center| 1
| align=center| 10:00
| Washington, United States
|

See also
List of male mixed martial artists

References

External links
 Yohei Suzuki at CageRank.com
 

1973 births
Japanese male mixed martial artists
Lightweight mixed martial artists
Living people